The Book of Ruins is a supplement for fantasy role-playing games published by Judges Guild in 1981.

Contents
The Book of Ruins consists of ten miniscenarios, dungeons set in ruins of all sorts.  Inhabitants include ogres, carnivorous apes, huge spiders, orcs, and efreets.

The Book of Ruins consists of ten brief dungeon-type adventures using four to eight AD&D characters.  Each adventure takes place in a building with 3-20 rooms, and is designed for characters of given levels: Three are for 1st-3rd level characters, one for 8th-10th, four in between and one higher.  Suggestions are given for integrating scenarios into an existing campaign.

Publication history
The Book of Ruins was written by Michael Mayeau, and was published by Judges Guild in 1981 as a 32-page book.

Reception
Ronald Pehr reviewed the adventure in The Space Gamer No. 41. He commented that "This book was a pleasant surprise.  At first glance, the scenarios appeared too short, simple-minded, nothing but slay-monsters-rake-in-fabulous-loot; characteristic of AD&D adventures.  But they were fun to play!  The higher level scenarios fully challenge the powers of the players: Scout ahead, guard your flanks, support each other, or you don't get out alive!" He continued: "However, each scenario is only slay-monsters-rake-in-etc.  The low level scenarios are too short, the AD&D hit point system brings low-level characters instant death or instant victory, and treasure is far too generous for what the characters accomplish." Pehr concluded the review by saying "AD&D is billed as a role-playing game. The Book of Ruins has little of that.  But if you take it for what it's worth – fast action adventures, for random adventures or part of a campaign – and if you enjoy gaming which is heavy on the bloody combat, you won't be disappointed."

References

Judges Guild fantasy role-playing game supplements
Role-playing game supplements introduced in 1981